Eboda ethnia is a species of moth of the family Tortricidae. It is found in India (Sikkim).

References

Moths described in 1991
Tortricini